Autumn exhibition may refer to:

 Autumn exhibition (Leningrad, 1956)
 Autumn exhibition (Leningrad, 1958)
 Autumn exhibition (Leningrad, 1962)
 Autumn exhibition (Leningrad, 1968)
 Autumn Exhibition (Leningrad, 1978)